Čestmír Řanda (5 December 1923 – 31 August 1986) was a Czechoslovak film actor. He appeared in over 65 films and television shows between 1960 and 1986.

Selected filmography
 Bílá spona (1960)
 Hvězda zvaná Pelyněk (1964)
 Lidé z maringotek (1966)
 Přísně tajné premiéry (1967)
 Nejlepší ženská mého života (1968)
 Witchhammer (1970)
 How to Drown Dr. Mracek, the Lawyer (1974)
 Zaklęte rewiry (1975)
 Což takhle dát si špenát (1977)

References

External links
 

1923 births
1986 deaths
Czech male film actors
People from Rokycany
20th-century Czech male actors